Polish concentration camp(s) or Polish death camp(s) may refer to:

 German camps in occupied Poland during World War II
 Camps for Russian prisoners and internees in Poland (1919–1924)
 Bereza Kartuska Prison
 Zgoda labour camp
 Jaworzno concentration camp
 "Polish death camp" controversy